The 1926 Tour de France was the 20th edition of the Tour de France, one of cycling's Grand Tours. The Tour began in Evian with a flat stage on 20 June, and Stage 9 occurred on 4 July with a flat stage to Bayonne. The race finished in Paris on 18 July.

Stage 1
20 June 1926 - Evian to Mülhausen,

Stage 2
22 June 1926 - Mülhausen to Metz,

Stage 3
24 June 1926 - Metz to Dunkerque,

Stage 4
26 June 1926 - Dunkerque to Le Havre,

Stage 5
28 June 1926 - Le Havre to Cherbourg-en-Cotentin,

Stage 6
30 June 1926 - Cherbourg-en-Cotentin to Brest,

Stage 7
2 July 1926 - Brest to Les Sables d'Olonne,

Stage 8
3 July 1926 - Les Sables d'Olonne to Bordeaux,

Stage 9
4 July 1926 - Bordeaux to Bayonne,

References

1926 Tour de France
Tour de France stages